The NWA National Television Championship was a secondary singles championship in the National Wrestling Alliance's Georgia Championship Wrestling territory. It started as the NWA Georgia Television Championship before becoming the National Television Championship. From 1983 to 1985, it was renamed the NWA World Television Championship, but when Jim Crockett Promotions purchased Georgia Championship Wrestling back from the World Wrestling Federation, the Georgia version of the NWA World Television Championship was reduced back to the NWA National Television Championship, in favor of the Crockett version. On April 21, 1985, the championship was abandoned.

Title history

List of combined reigns

Notes

References

External links
NWA National Television Championship history at Wrestling-Titles.com
NWA World Television Championship history at Wrestling-Titles.com

Georgia Championship Wrestling championships
Television wrestling championships
Regional professional wrestling championships